The International Science Programme (ISP) is an independent unit at Uppsala University under the Faculty of Science and Technology, in Uppsala, Sweden.

History 
ISP was founded in 1961 by Tor Ragnar Gerholm at the Uppsala University Institute of Physics as a scholarship program called The International Seminar in Physics. The program provided scholarships for physics researchers from academic institutions in low-income countries. 

Since its inception in 1961, ISP has awarded 1700 researchers and doctoral students scholarships and research visits to Sweden and other nations.

A program in mathematics was added in 2002.

External links 
 ISP

References 

Uppsala University